Ken Liu (born 1976) is an American author of science fiction and fantasy.  His epic fantasy series The Dandelion Dynasty, which he describes as silkpunk, is published by Simon & Schuster. Liu has won Hugo and Nebula Awards for his short fiction, which has appeared in F&SF, Asimov's, Analog, Lightspeed, Clarkesworld, and multiple "Year's Best" anthologies.

Childhood and career
Liu was born in 1976 in Lanzhou, China. He spent his childhood with his grandparents. His mother, who received her Ph.D. in chemistry in the United States, is a pharmaceutical chemist, while his father is a computer engineer. The family immigrated to the United States when Liu was 11 years old. They lived in California and Stonington, Connecticut before settling in Waterford, Connecticut. Liu graduated from Waterford High School in 1994, where he ran cross-country and track. At Harvard College, he studied English Literature and Computer Science, receiving his A. B. in 1998.

After graduation, Liu worked as a software engineer for Microsoft, and then joined a start-up in Cambridge, Massachusetts. He later received his J.D. from Harvard Law School in 2004 and after working as a corporate lawyer, eventually became a high-tech litigation consultant.

Liu began publishing fiction in 2002. His first published work was "Carthaginian Rose", a short story on mind uploading, which was published alongside nine other authors in The Phobos Science Fiction Anthology Volume 1.

Liu has said he wanted to become a writer so he could make stories that “turn values upside down and inside out to gain new perspectives”.

After a long career writing and publishing short fiction, Liu turned to epic fantasy novels, starting with The Grace of Kings (2015). He has also written for the Star Wars universe, with The Legends of Luke Skywalker (2017).

Along with his original work, Liu has translated the works of multiple Chinese authors into English, including Liu Cixin, Hao Jingfang, Chen Qiufan, and Xia Jia. His translation of The Three Body Problem by Liu Cixin helped the book become a best seller to English readers. He has also worked as an editor. While editing the anthology Invisible Planets, Ken Liu translated the stories contained within it from Chinese into English.

Some of Liu's work have been adapted into visual media. His short story "Memories of My Mother" was the basis of Beautiful Dreamer (2016) by David Gaddie. His short story "Real Artists" was adapted into the short film Real Artists (2017) by Cameo Wood. His short story "Good Hunting"  was adapted into an animated short as part of Netflix's Love, Death & Robots series (2019).

Liu's short story collection “The Hidden Girl and Other Stories” (2020) explores ideas such as tradition and progress, the fallibility of memory, and the essence of what it means to be human.

Liu lives with his family near Boston, Massachusetts.

Awards

Liu's short story "The Paper Menagerie" is the first work of fiction, of any length, to win all of the Nebula, Hugo, and World Fantasy Awards. In addition, his short story, "Mono no aware" won the 2013 Hugo Award, and his novella "The Man Who Ended History: A Documentary" was also nominated for a Hugo. The first novel in his The Dandelion Dynasty series, The Grace of Kings, was a 2016 Nebula Award finalist. The novel was the 2016 Locus Award Best First Novel winner.

Besides his original work, Liu's translation of Liu Cixin's Chinese language novel The Three-Body Problem (the first in the Remembrance of Earth's Past trilogy) won the 2015 Hugo Award for Best Novel, making it the first translated novel to have won the award. Liu also translated the third volume of the Remembrance of Earth's Past series, Death's End, in 2016, which was a 2017 Hugo Award for Best Novel finalist.

One of Liu's short stories, "Thoughts and Prayers", is a part of Jonathan Strahan's The Year's Best Science Fiction (2020), Vol 1.

Winner
2017 Locus Award for Best Science Fiction Novel, winner, "Death's End" by Cixin Liu, translated by Ken Liu
2017 Locus Award for Best Collection, winner, The Paper Menagerie and Other Stories
2016 Locus Award for Best First Novel, winner, The Grace of Kings
2015 Hugo Award for Best Novel, winner, "The Three-Body Problem (三体)" by Cixin Liu, translated by Ken Liu
2015 Sidewise Award for Alternate History, winner, "The Long Haul: From the Annals of Transportation, The Pacific Monthly, May 2009"
2013 Hugo Award for Best Short Story, winner, "Mono no aware"
2013 FantLab's Book of the Year Award for best Translated Novella or Short Story, winner, "Mono no aware"
2013 FantLab's Book of the Year Award for best On-line publication in Small Form', winner, "The Paper Menagerie"
2012 Science Fiction & Fantasy Translation Awards, Short Form winner, translation from the Chinese of "The Fish of Lijiang" by Chen Qiufan
2012 World Fantasy Award for Best Short Fiction, winner, "The Paper Menagerie"
2012 Hugo Award for Best Short Story, winner, "The Paper Menagerie"
2011 Nebula Award for Best Short Story, winner, "The Paper Menagerie"

Nominated or finalist
2020 Locus Award for Best Short Story, finalist, "Thoughts and Prayers"
2017 Hugo Award for Best Novel, finalist, "Death's End" by Cixin Liu, translated by Ken Liu
2017 World Fantasy Award, nominee, The Paper Menagerie and Other Stories, Best Collection
2015 Locus Award for Best Novella, finalist, "The Regular"
2015 Theodore Sturgeon Award, finalist, "The Regular"
2014 Nebula Award for Best Novel, nominee, "The Three-Body Problem (三体)" by Cixin Liu, translated by Ken Liu
2014 Nebula Award for Best Novella, nominee, "The Regular"
2014 Sidewise Award for Alternate History, nominee, "A Brief History of the Trans-Pacific Tunnel"
2014 Locus Award for Best Short Story, finalist, "A Brief History of the Trans-Pacific Tunnel"
2013 Locus Award for Best Short Story, finalist, "Mono no aware"
2013 Nebula Award for Best Novelette, nominee, "The Litigation Master and the Monkey King"
2013 Theodore Sturgeon Award, finalist, "The Bookmaking Habits of Select Species" and "Mono no aware"
2012 Nebula Award for Best Short Story, nominee, "The Bookmaking Habits of Select Species"
2012 Nebula Award for Best Novelette, nominee, "The Waves"
2012 Nebula Award for Best Novella, nominee, "All the Flavors"
2012 Theodore Sturgeon Award, finalist, "The Man Who Ended History: A Documentary" and "The Paper Menagerie"
2012 Locus Award for Best Short Story, finalist, "The Paper Menagerie"
2012 Hugo Award for Best Novella, nominee, "The Man Who Ended History: A Documentary"
2011 Nebula Award for Best Novella, nominee, "The Man Who Ended History: A Documentary"

 Bibliography 

Novels

The Dandelion Dynasty

Speaking Bones. Saga Press. June 2022.

 Short fiction 
Collections

Anthologies (edited)
 Invisible Planets, Tor Books, November 2016
 Broken Stars, Tor Books, February 2019
Short stories

 "Thoughts and Prayers" (2019)
 The Cleaners, December 15, 2020 is a magic realist story about cleansing memories.
"The Sith of Datawork", From a Certain Point of View (Star Wars), October 3, 2017
 "The Long Haul: From the Annals of Transportation, The Pacific Monthly, May 2009" (online), Clarkesworld Magazine, November 2014
 "Presence" (online), Uncanny, November/December 2014
 "The Regular", Upgraded, edited by Neil Clarke, September 2014
 "The Gods Will Not Be Slain", The End is Now (Book II of the Apocalypse Triptych), edited by John Joseph Adams and Hugh Howey, September 2014
 "Running Shoes" (online), SQ Mag, Issue 16, September 2014
 "Homo Florensis", Solaris Rising 3, August 2014
 "In the Loop", War Stories, edited by Andrew Liptak and Jaym Gates, August 2014
 "Seventh Day of the Seventh Moon" (online), Kaleidoscope, edited by Alisa Krasnostein and Julia Rios, August 2014
 (with Lisa Tang Liu) "Hark! Listen to the Animals", Galaxy's Edge, Issue 9, July 2014
 "What I Assume You Shall Assume", Dead Man's Hand, edited by John Joseph Adams, May 2014
 "Knotting Grass, Holding Ring", Long Hidden, edited by Rose Fox and Daniel José Older, May 2014
 "Lecture 14: Concerning the Event Cloaking Device and Practical Applications Thereof" (online), Cosmos, April 2014
 "The Ten Suns", Dark Expanse: Surviving the Collapse, March 2014
 "The Gods Will Not Be Chained", The End is Nigh (Book I of the Apocalypse Triptych), edited by John Joseph Adams and Hugh Howey, March 2014
 "None Owns the Air", Lightspeed Magazine, February 2014
 "What Is Expected of a Wedding Host" (online), Daily Science Fiction, February 2014
 "The Reborn" (online), Tor.com, January 2014
 "Second Chance" (online), Nature, January 2014
 "The Clockwork Soldier" (online), Clarkesworld Magazine, January 2014
 "You'll Always Have the Burden With You", republished, Perihelion Science Fiction, December 2013
 "The Litigation Master and the Monkey King" (online), Lightspeed Magazine, August 2013
 "The Plague", Nature, May 16, 2013
 "The Messenger's Tale", Aoife's Kiss, Issue 43, Winter 2012/2013 issue, December 2012
 "The Perfect Match" (online), Lightspeed Magazine, December 2012
 "Good Hunting", (online), Strange Horizons, October 9, 2012
 "The Perfect Book", Analog, December 2012 issue, September 22, 2012
 "Arc", F&SF, September/October issue, September 2012
 "Summer Reading", Daily Science Fiction, September 4, 2012
 "Cutting", Electric Velocipede, Issue 24, July 30, 2012
 "You'll Always Have the Burden With You", In Situ, Dagan Books, July 10, 2012
 "Dear Emily", The Memory Eater Anthology, July 5, 2012
 "The Silk Merchant", Apex, Issue 38, July 3, 2012
 "Celestial Bodies", Nature, June 28, 2012
 "Real Faces", F&SF, July/August issue, June 22, 2012
 "The Illusionist" (online), Goldfish Grimm's Spicy Fiction Sushi, Issue 4, June 2, 2012
 "Mono no aware", The Future is Japanese, May 15, 2012; republished (online), Lightspeed Magazine, June 2013
 "The Tome of Tourmaline" (online), Daily Science Fiction, May 9, 2012
 "The Shadowcrafter", Nine, Issue 1, April 2012
 "Intelligent Design" (online), Schrodinger's Mouse, April 2012
 "Monkeys" (online), Nature's * "Futures" feature, April 19, 2012
 "To the Moon", Fireside, April 17, 2012
 "Memories of My Mother" (online), Daily Science Fiction, March 19, 2012
 "All the Flavors" (online), GigaNotoSaurus, February 2012
 "The Five Elements of the Heart Mind" (online), Lightspeed Magazine, January 24, 2012
 "Maxwell's Demon", The Magazine of Fantasy & Science Fiction, January/February 2012
 "The People of Pele", Asimov's, February 2012
 "The Last Summer", 10 Flash, January 2012
 "The Necrocracy", Penumbra, December 2011
 "The Countable", Asimov's, December 2011
 "Justice FAIRBOT", 140 And Counting, edited by Joanne Merriam, December 11, 2011
 "Life Plus Seventy" (online),  Kasma SF, November 23, 2011
 "Safe Empathy", Daily Science Fiction, November 21, 2011
 "Staying Behind" (online), Clarkesworld Magazine, October 1, 2011
 "Golden Years in the Paleozoic", Andromeda Spaceways Inflight Magazine, Issue #52, September 2011
 "Real Artists", TRSF (September 2011), a special publication of MIT's Technology Review "The Last Seed" (online), Daily Science Fiction, September 26, 2011
 "The Man Who Ended History: A Documentary", Panverse Three, edited by Dario Ciriello, September 2011
 "Music of the Spheres", Mirror Shards: Exploring the Edges of Augmented Reality (Volume One), 2011
 "The Box That Eats Memories" (online), Daily Science Fiction, August 10, 2011
 "Hark! Listen to the Animals", The ePocalypse: e-mails at the end, co-written with Lisa Tang Liu, August 2011
 "The Caretaker", Digital Science Fiction, June 2011
 "Altogether Elsewhere, Vast Herds of Reindeer", The Magazine of Fantasy & Science Fiction, May/June 2011.
 "The Paper Menagerie"  The Magazine of Fantasy & Science Fiction, March/April 2011.
 "Ad Block", (online),  Kasma SF, March 19, 2011
 "The Visit" (online), On the Premises, March 2011 (Issue 13)
 "Simulacrum" (online), Lightspeed Magazine, February 15, 2011
 "To the Stars" (online), Nature's * "Futures" feature, co-written with Shelly Li, February 3, 2011
 "The Chase", Every Day Fiction, January 28, 2011
 "Tying Knots" (online), Clarkesworld Magazine, January 2011
 "Saving Face" (online), Crossed Genres, co-written with Shelly Li, January 1, 2011
 "The Letter" (online), Every Day Fiction, December 5, 2010
 "The Literomancer", The Magazine of Fantasy & Science Fiction, September/October 2010
 "The Phoenix" (online), On the Premises, July 2010 (Issue 11)
 "Beidou (??)", The Dragon and the Stars, edited by Derwin Mak and Eric Choi, May 2010.
 "Single-Bit Error", Thoughtcrime Experiments, edited by Sumana Harihareswara and Leonard Richardson, 2009 (read) (buy); International Speculative Fiction, edited by Roberto Mendes, December 2013;
 "Beneath the Language"  (online), On the Premises, July 2007 (Issue 2)
 "State Change", Polyphony 4, edited by Deborah Layne and Jay Lake, September 2004.
 "The Algorithms for Love" (online), Strange Horizons, July 2004; International Speculative Fiction, edited by Roberto Mendes, July 2012;
 "Gossamer", Writers of the Future, Vol. 19, 2003.
 "Carthaginian Rose", Empire of Dreams and Miracles: The Phobos Science Fiction Anthology Volume 1, edited by Orson Scott Card and Keith Olexa, 2002.
 "The Ussuri Bear" (online), Originally published in THE BEAST WITHIN 4, edited by Jennifer Brozek, 2014

Translations
 "Vagabonds" by Hao Jingfang, April 2020
 "Waste Tide" by Chen Qiufan, April 2019 
 "Fields of Gold" by Liu Cixin, May 2018
 "The Robot Who Liked to Tell Tall Tales" by Fei Dao, Clarkesworld Magazine, April 2017
 "The Snow of Jinyang" by Zhang Ran, ,Clarkesworld Magazine, June 2016
 "The Flowers of Shazui" by Chen Qiufan, Interzone, November 2012
 "Taking Care of God" by Liu Cixin (online), Pathlight, March 2012
 "A Hundred Ghosts Parade Tonight" by Xia Jia (online), Clarkesworld Magazine, February 2012
 "The City of Silence" by Ma Boyong
 "The Mark Twain Robots" by Ma Boyong, TRSF (September 2011), a special publication of MIT's Technology Review "The Fish of Lijiang" by Chen Qiufan (online), Clarkesworld Magazine, August 2011
"Gathered in Translation", an essay on  the process and subtleties of translating Chinese SF to English, and the reverse:  online at Clarkesworld Magazine, April 2013
Remembrance of Earth's Past Series
 Book 1: The Three-Body Problem, Tor Books, November 2014 (originally the Chinese language novel Three Body, 三体, 2008, by Liu Cixin)
 Book 3: Death's End, Tor Books, September 2016 by Liu Cixin (originally the Chinese language novel Death's End, 死神永生, 2010 by Liu Cixin)
 Book 4: The Redemption of Time, Tor Books, 2019 by Baoshu (originally a Chinese fanfic by Li Jun that was regularized by the original publisher Chongqing Press and series creator Cixin Liu; and published in 2011)

Liu's works in translation
Many of Liu's short stories have been translated into Chinese, Japanese, French, Spanish, and multiple other languages and published in short stories collections:

Chinese
 爱的算法 ("Algorithms for Love and Others"), published by SFW Publishing, September 5, 2012
 思维的形状 ("The Shape of Thought and Others"), published by Tsinghua University Press, November 11, 2014
 杀敌算法 ("In the Loop and Others"), published by SFW Publishing, March, 2015
 奇点遗民 ("Staying behind")，published by Baror International, Inc. Armonk New York, U.S.A, 2017

Japanese
 紙の動物園, published by Hayakawa, edited by 古沢嘉通 (Yoshimichi Furusawa), April 2015

French
  La Ménagerie de papier ("The Paper Menagerie") published by Editions du Bélial, edited by Ellen Herzfeld and Dominique Martel, 2015.
  Jardins de poussière ("Dust gardens") published by Editions du Bélial, edited by Ellen Herzfeld and Dominique Martel, 2019.

Spanish
  El zoo de papel y otros relatos ("The Paper Menagerie") published by Runas, Alianza Editorial, edited by María Pilar San Román Navarro, 2017.

Filmography
Television
The 2022 AMC+ series Pantheon is an animated version based on Liu's sci-fi short stories "The Gods Will Not Be Chained", "The Gods Will Not Be Slain", "The Gods Have Not Died in Vain",  "Staying Behind" and "Altogether Elsewhere, Vast Herds of Reindeer" from the short fictions collection The Hidden Girl and Other Stories.

References

External links
 
 
 " Liu, Ken" (The Encyclopedia of Science Fiction''; by Jonathan Clements)
 Ken Liu profile, NY Times Dec. 3, 2019.  Focuses on his translations of Chinese SF.

1976 births
Living people
American male novelists
American male poets
American male short story writers
American science fiction writers
American short story writers
American speculative fiction translators
American writers of Chinese descent
Analog Science Fiction and Fact people
Asimov's Science Fiction people
Chinese–English translators
Harvard College alumni
Harvard Law School alumni
Hugo Award-winning writers
Nebula Award winners
Sidewise Award winners
World Fantasy Award-winning writers